Johao Alberto Martínez Villegas (born 20 April 1999) is a Venezuelan footballer who plays as a midfielder for Venezuelan Primera División side Zulia FC.

Club career
Martínez made his senior debut in a Derby del Lago win against JBL Zulia.

Career statistics

Club

Notes

References

1999 births
Living people
Venezuelan footballers
Association football midfielders
Zulia F.C. players
Venezuelan Primera División players
People from Maracaibo
Sportspeople from Maracaibo
21st-century Venezuelan people